Clovenfords railway station served the village of Clovenfords, Scottish Borders, Scotland from 1866 to 1962 on the Peebles Railway.

History 
The station opened on 18 June 1866 by the Peebles Railway. It was situated on the north side of Station Yard. In 1880, the map shows a small station building and no goods yard but by the late 19th century the building had been enlarged and a small goods yard was provided. The goods yard consisted of a loop giving access from both sides and passed a cattle dock. At the south end of the dock, a siding left the loop and split; one road leading to a timber goods shed and the other going behind it. The station closed to passengers and goods traffic on 5 February 1962.

References

External links 

Disused railway stations in the Scottish Borders
Former North British Railway stations
Railway stations in Great Britain opened in 1866
Railway stations in Great Britain closed in 1962
1866 establishments in Scotland
1962 disestablishments in Scotland